The Kolkata Derby, (locally known as "Boro Match" or 'Big Match' in Bengali), is the football match in Kolkata, between arch rivals East Bengal and ATK Mohun Bagan (Mohun Bagan till 2019–20). In January 2020, Kolkata based Indian Super League club ATK and the football department of Mohun Bagan merged to form ATK Mohun Bagan. The rivalry between these two teams is exactly 99 years old, and the matches witnessed large audience attendance and rivalry between patrons. It is considered as one of the biggest Asian footballing rivalries. The first match was played on 8 August 1921 in Coochbehar Cup and latest match of this historical derby was played on 25 February 2023 in Indian Super League. The Kolkata Derby is considered to be greatest derby in Asian Football and also one of the biggest derbies in the world.

The two clubs meet at least 3 times a year, twice in the Indian Super League and once in the Calcutta Football League. Often these two clubs met in other competitions like the Durand Cup, IFA Shield, Super Cup etc.

Both teams have huge and dedicated fan bases around the world. Both clubs represent a specific class of Bengali people, Mohun Bagan represented people existing in the western part of Bengal (known as Ghotis), while East Bengal is primarily supported by people hailing from the eastern part of pre-independence Bengal province (known as Bangals). Culturally, this derby is very similar to the Scottish Professional Football League's Old Firm derby, since a majority of the Mohun Bagan supporters represent the 'nativist' population (similar to Rangers) and a majority of the East Bengal fans represent the 'immigrant' population (similar to Celtic).

Kolkata Derby matches in major competitions

Kolkata Derby in ISL

Overall in ISL

Kolkata Derby in NFL/I-League

Overall in NFL / I-League

Kolkata Derby in Federation Cup
List of all Kolkata Derby played in Federation Cup

Overall in Federation Cup

Kolkata Derby in IFA Shield
List of all Kolkata Derby played in IFA Shield

Note: Since 2015 IFA Shield is a U-19 Tournament. Clashes after 2015 is not taken into account.

Overall in IFA Shield

Kolkata Derby in Durand Cup
List of all Kolkata Derby played in Durand Cup

Overall in Durand Cup

Kolkata Derby in Rovers Cup
List of all Kolkata Derby played in Rovers Cup

Overall in Rovers Cup

Kolkata Derby in Calcutta Football League
List of all Kolkata Derby played in Calcutta Football League

Overall in Calcutta Football League

 [a] Includes 6 W/O - Walkover matches

Kolkata Derby in other domestic competitions

Kolkata Derby exhibition matches

Overall in exhibition matches

Overall record of Kolkata Derby

Matches since 2000
List of all Derby Matches played since 2000

2000–01

2001–02

2002–03

2003–04

2004–05

2005–06

2006–07

2007–08

2008–09

2009–10

2010–11

2011–12

2012–13

2013–14

2014–15

2015–16

2016–17

2017–18

2018–19

2019–20

2020–21

2021–22

2022–23

Statistics
Top scorers

Hat-tricks

4 Scored 4 goals

Foreign referee in Kolkata Derby

Footnotes

References

Bibliography
 Books

External links
 Indian Football Seasons
 Calcutta League Seasons
 East Bengal  Seasons

Sport in Kolkata
East Bengal Club related lists
Mohun Bagan AC related lists
Association football rivalries in India